Tenorio Volcano is an inactive andesitic stratovolcano in north-western Costa Rica. It is the main geographical feature of the eponymous Tenorio Volcano National Park.

Toponymy 

The name comes from the Chorotega legend of Eskameca and Tenorí. The name in its current form is first mentioned in a 1744 document, further in 1745 by historian León Fernández Bonilla.

Physical aspects 

It is composed of four volcanic peaks and two twin craters,  one of the craters is sometimes referred to as the Montezuma Volcano. The formation occupies a 225 km² area. In the lowest areas there is savanna, rain forest in the middle areas and cloud forest at the top. 

The rivers Tenorio, Tenorito and Martirio have their source in this volcano.

References 

Stratovolcanoes of Costa Rica